The Ramsey Public School District is a comprehensive community public school district that serves students in pre-kindergarten through twelfth grade from Ramsey in Bergen County, New Jersey, United States.

As of the 2021–22 school year, the district, comprised of five schools, had an enrollment of 2,598 students and 252.2 classroom teachers (on an FTE basis), for a student–teacher ratio of 10.3:1.

The district is classified by the New Jersey Department of Education as being in District Factor Group "I", the second-highest of eight groupings. District Factor Groups organize districts statewide to allow comparison by common socioeconomic characteristics of the local districts. From lowest socioeconomic status to highest, the categories are A, B, CD, DE, FG, GH, I and J.

Students from Saddle River's Wandell School attend the district's middle school and then have the option of attending either Ramsey High School or Northern Highlands Regional High School as part of sending/receiving relationships with the Saddle River School District and each of the respective districts.

Awards and recognition
For the 1995–96 school year, Eric S. Smith Middle School was named a "Star School" by the New Jersey Department of Education, the highest honor that a New Jersey school can achieve.

Construction and district reconfiguration 
On September 30, 2003, residents of Ramsey passed a referendum providing for the construction of a new Dater School, the construction of a new, six-lane track at the High School, and the renovation of the High School, Smith School and Hubbard School.

Ramsey High School's Track is now a six-lane, all-weather track and was completed in Fall/Winter 2004.
Ramsey High School will be renovating and adding classrooms. Construction was supposed to take place over the 2005-2006 school year and to be completed around July 2006, but this work was pushed back a year, with work to begin at the end of the 2005-2006 school year.
Eric S. Smith Middle School is reconfiguring and expanding its media center, cafeteria, and gymnasium, and creating new classrooms.
Mary A. Hubbard School will be converted into a building suitable for grades K-3, which actually is a partial return to its roots as a K-5 school. Some new rooms will be built, and others will be renovated.
The Wesley D. Tisdale School is not included in any construction or renovation projects.

Schools 
Schools in the district (with 2021–22 enrollment data from the National Center for Education Statistics) are:

Elementary schools
Mary A. Hubbard Elementary School with 371 students in grades PreK–3
Kathy Pina
Wesley D. Tisdale Elementary School with 332 students in grades PreK–3
Gina Aliano, Principal
John Y. Dater Elementary School with 385 students in grades 4–5
Courtney J. Rejent, Principal

Middle school
Eric S. Smith Middle School with 647 students in grades 6–8
Christine Davis, Interim Principal

High school
Ramsey High School with 828 students in grades 9–12
Dr. Michael J. Thumm, Principal

Administration 
Core members of the district's administration are:
Dr. Andrew C. Matteo, Superintendent
Thomas W. O'Hern, Business Administrator / Board Secretary

Board of education
The district's board of education is comprised of nine members who set policy and oversee the fiscal and educational operation of the district through its administration. As a Type II school district, the board's trustees are elected directly by voters to serve three-year terms of office on a staggered basis, with three seats up for election each year held (since 2015) as part of the November general election. The board appoints a superintendent to oversee the district's day-to-day operations and a business administrator to supervise the business functions of the district.

Gallery

References

External links 
Ramsey Public School District

School Data for the Ramsey Public School District, National Center for Education Statistics

Ramsey, New Jersey
New Jersey District Factor Group I
School districts in Bergen County, New Jersey